Adbaston is a village and a civil parish in the English county of Staffordshire.

Location 
The nearest railway station is at Stone. The nearest main roads are the A41 which passes the village  to the south west. The village is situated approximately halfway between towns of Eccleshall and Newport, Shropshire, and near the villages and hamlets of Cheswardine, Shropshire, and Woodseaves, High Offley and Knighton, Staffordshire.

History

Etymology
The name Adbaston is derived from the Anglo-Saxon personal name Eadbald and means 'Eadbald‘s town'; it was recorded in the Domesday Book of 1086 as Edboldestone and in the 12th and 13th century as Adbaldestone, Alboldestun, and Albaldiston.

Domesday Book 
Adbaston is listed in the Domesday Book of 1086; in the survey the village has the name Edboldestone. In the survey the settlement was described as quite small with only 5.8 households. Other Assets included 17 villager or villein, meadow of 15 acres, 40 smallholders and 1 slave. There was also 25 ploughlands (land for), 3 lord's plough teams, 13 men's plough teams. In 1066 the lord of the manor was held by Robert, Bishop of Chester. Before that the lord of the manor was said to have been previously Leofwine Bishop of Lichfield.

Present day
The village contains a church, "St Michael and All Angels", and a phone box. There was once a school but it closed due to diminishing numbers of children.

See also
Listed buildings in Adbaston

References

External links
 
 

Villages in Staffordshire
Borough of Stafford
Civil parishes in Staffordshire